Keith Punch (born 19 October 1940) is an Australian cricketer. He played fifteen first-class matches for Western Australia between 1960/61 and 1963/64.

References

External links
 

1940 births
Living people
Australian cricketers
Western Australia cricketers
Cricketers from Perth, Western Australia